Teresa Jesus Armstrong (born 1966) is a politician in Ontario, Canada. She is a New Democratic member of the Legislative Assembly of Ontario who was elected in the 2011 election. She represents the riding of London—Fanshawe.

Background
Armstrong lives in London, Ontario with her husband Bill. Armstrong has two children and three grandchildren. Bill Armstrong was a former city councillor in London.

Politics
In 2011, Armstrong ran as the NDP candidate in the riding of London—Fanshawe. She defeated Liberal incumbent Khalil Ramal by 4,275 votes.  She was re-elected in the 2014 election defeating Progressive Conservative candidate Chris Robson by 9,761 votes.

Within the Ontario NDP caucus, Armstrong has championed senior's interests. She was the party's critic  for Citizenship, Immigration and International Trade and for Senior's Issues between 2014 and 2018. After the 2018 Ontario general election her critic portfolio encompassed home care and long term care. After the 2022 election, interim leader Peter Tabuns named Armstrong the party's critic on affordability and pensions.

Electoral record

References

External links

1966 births
Living people
Ontario New Democratic Party MPPs
Politicians from London, Ontario
Women MPPs in Ontario
21st-century Canadian politicians
21st-century Canadian women politicians